The Enoplia are a subclass of nematodes in the class Enoplea.

Description 
Enoplians are characterized by amphids shaped like ovals, stirrups, or pouches. Their bodies are smooth, without rings or lines. The esophagus is cylindrical and glandular.

Taxonomy 
Lorenzen described two orders, Enoplida and Trefusiida, in the 1980s based on morphology. With the advent of phylogenetic analysis, a reorganisation has been necessary, moving the Triplonchida here to create three orders and expanding it. 

The orders are distinguished mainly by habitat type.

Enoplida Filipjev, 1929 – nematodes of marine and brackish water habitat, carnivorous or feed on diatoms and other algaes
Triplonchida Cobb, 1920 – terrestrial nematodes, including some plant parasites
Trefusiida Lorenzen, 1981

References

Bibliography 

De Ley, P & Blaxter, M 2004, 'A new system for Nematoda: combining morphological characters with molecular trees, and translating clades into ranks and taxa'. in R Cook & DJ Hunt (eds), Nematology Monographs and Perspectives. vol. 2, E.J. Brill, Leiden, pp. 633–653.

 
Protostome subclasses